Elzhana Taniyeva (born 5 September 2005) is a Kazakh rhythmic gymnast.

Personal life 
Taniyeva speaks Russian and English. Her idol is Kazakhstani rhythmic gymnast Aliya Yussupova. She has trained at Irina Viner-Usmanova Rhythmic Gymnastics Centre in Moscow, Russia and has received the title of Master of Sport of International Class in Kazakhstan.

Career

Junior 
Elzhana competed in the 1st Rhythmic Gymnastics Junior World Championships in Moscow, Russia, finishing 13th in the team event and 21st with ribbon. She qualified for the rope final, finishing in 4th just down the podium.

Senior 
In 2021 she took part in the Moscow World Cup, qualifying for all the finals however she did not win any medal. Later that year Taniyeva was selected to compete at the 38th Rhythmic Gymnastics World Championship in Kitakyushu, Japan finishing mid ranking in the four events.

Her 2022 started with the Palaio Faliro World Cup, Elzhana finished 6th in the hoop final. In Sofia she qualified for the hoop, ball and clubs final, winning bronze in the latter. Baku saw her 4th in the ball final and 5th in the clubs'.

Routine music information

References 

Living people
2005 births
Kazakhstani rhythmic gymnasts